Zachary Pollari (born October 2, 1986) is a former Canadian Football League offensive tackle for the Toronto Argonauts of the Canadian Football League. He was drafted by the Argonauts in the fourth round of the 2009 CFL Draft. Pollari was later released by the Argonauts on June 17, 2010 after a game vs the Hamilton Tiger-Cats in which he fractured his sternum. After his recovery, he competed for Canada at the IFAF World Championship In Vienna, Austria in the summer of 2011. He was selected as a 1st Team All-star  at the tournament. That fall, he re-signed with the Toronto Argonauts on October 19, 2011.  He was ultimately released on June 13, 2012. He played CIS football for the Western Ontario Mustangs from 2005 - 2009.

Pollari now lives in Guelph and is a teacher and coach at Centennial Collegiate Vocational Institute.

References

External links
Just Sports Stats
Toronto Argonauts bio
2011 Toronto Argonauts Roster
http://footballcanada.com/7-canadians-named-to-1st-team-ifaf-wc-all-tournament-team

1986 births
Living people
Canadian football offensive linemen
Western Mustangs football players
Toronto Argonauts players